The Crossroads of the American Revolution National Heritage Area (XRDS) is a federally designated National Heritage Area encompassing portions of fourteen counties in New Jersey that were the scene of significant actions in the American Revolutionary War in late 1776 through 1778. The designated area covers the Delaware and Hudson valleys in New Jersey and the central portion of the state between the valleys where the Continental Army fought forces under British command. The National Heritage Area includes Morristown National Historical Park and sites associated with the Battle of Monmouth as well as Princeton, New Jersey, the meeting place of the Continental Congress when peace was declared in 1783. 

At the direction of Congress, the National Park Service studied the national importance of the Revolutionary War resources in New Jersey.  In 2002 the United States Secretary of the Interior told Congress that New Jersey met all the requirements for becoming a National Heritage Area. President George W. Bush signed the legislation making XRDS an official heritage area in 2006.

The territory covered by XRDS totals 14 counties.  These counties (north to south) are Passaic, Bergen, Morris, Essex, Hudson, Union, Hunterdon, Somerset, Middlesex, Mercer, Monmouth, Burlington, Camden and Gloucester.

Crossroads of the American Revolution Association is a not-for-profit organization created in 2002 in order to increase awareness of the American Revolution in New Jersey.  The organization promotes open space, historical preservation and an enhancement of economic development in New Jersey. The Association was designated by the National Park Service as the management entity responsible for the National Heritage Area.

See also

New Jersey in the American Revolution

References

External links

U. S. National Parks Site on the Crossroads of the American Revolution National Heritage Area

Organizations based in New Jersey
National Heritage Areas of the United States
Protected areas established in 2006
2006 establishments in New Jersey
Protected areas of Passaic County, New Jersey
Protected areas of Bergen County, New Jersey
Protected areas of Morris County, New Jersey
Protected areas of Essex County, New Jersey
Protected areas of Hudson County, New Jersey
Protected areas of Union County, New Jersey
Protected areas of Hunterdon County, New Jersey
Protected areas of Somerset County, New Jersey
Protected areas of Middlesex County, New Jersey
Protected areas of Mercer County, New Jersey
Protected areas of Monmouth County, New Jersey
Protected areas of Burlington County, New Jersey
Protected areas of Camden County, New Jersey
Protected areas of Gloucester County, New Jersey
Organizations established in 2002
2002 establishments in New Jersey
Morristown National Historical Park
Princeton, New Jersey